is a railway station located in the city of Kitaakita, Akita Prefecture, Japan, operated by the third sector railway operator Akita Nairiku Jūkan Railway.

Lines
Nishi-Takanosu Station is served by the Nariku Line, and is located 1.3 km from the terminus of the line at Takanosu Station.

Station layout
The station consists of one side platform serving a single bi-directional track. The station is unattended.

Adjacent stations

History
Nishi-Takanosu Station opened on April 1, 1989 serving the town of Takanosu, Akita.

Surrounding area
 Kitaakika City Fire Department
 Kitaakita City Police Department

External links

 Nairiku Railway Station information 

Railway stations in Japan opened in 1989
Railway stations in Akita Prefecture
Kitaakita